Ewido Networks was a software company based in Germany  known for creating Ewido Anti-Spyware. Ewido Anti-Spyware was software used to remove malware such as spyware, trojan horses, adware, dialers, and worms. It also featured real-time protection, automatic updates, and other privacy features. Ewido had both a free version, and a paid version which added realtime protection, and automatic updates.

History
Ewido networks was founded in Germany in 2004 by Andreas Rudyk, Peter Klapprodt and Tobias Graf. Their first product was Ewido Security Suite. Ewido was given Digital River's ICE award for "Best newcomer of the year".

Grisoft Acquisition
On April 19, 2006 it was announced that Czech Grisoft had acquired the German Anti-Malware company Ewido Networks. This was the birth of Grisoft's AVG Anti Spyware, an anti spyware based on Ewido's engine. Grisoft now includes ewido in many security suites and bundles and antivirus products.

Ewido Anti-Spyware
This software began life as Ewido Security Suite and the name was changed to Ewido Anti-malware in December 2005. With the release of 4.0, it was later changed again to Ewido Anti-Spyware.

Ewido Anti-Spyware included new features such as scheduled scans, file shredder, running process manager, and a new interface. It also included an LSP and BHO viewer. There was a free version with no realtime protection and automatic updates (Users could update manually). The last known price was $29.99.

After Grisoft's acquisition, however, Ewido's Anti-Spyware development has not stopped. It continues to exist as Ewido Online Scanner or Ewido Micro Scanner, using the full Ewido engine and signatures, without excluding heuristic detection options. As of AVG 8.0, AVG Anti-Spyware is integrated into AVG Anti-Virus and is no longer available as a standalone product. That means that AVG Anti-Spyware will no longer receive updates. 

Ewido works with many popular antivirus and other spyware products such as:
 AVG Anti-Virus
 Ad-Aware
 Avast! Antivirus
 Avira Security Software
 Comodo Internet Security
 CounterSpy
 Kaspersky Anti-Virus
 McAfee
 Norton AntiVirus
 Sophos
 Spybot Search & Destroy
 Spyware Doctor
 ZoneAlarm Security Suite

See also
 Grisoft
 Malware
 Spyware

References

External links
 Ewido's Official site

Software companies of Germany
Antivirus software
Spyware removal
Windows security software
Windows-only software